HIMALAYAS are a Welsh rock group from Cardiff, Wales, formed in 2015. The group currently consists of Mike Griffiths (lead guitar and vocals), Joe Williams (rhythm guitar and vocals), Louis Heaps (bass) and James Goulbourn (drums).

The group are described as energetic live performers, offering music with "seductive guitar lines, hip bass parts that will groove you to the core all driven by an avalanche of drums."

History 
Goulbourn, Griffiths, and Williams all met in school and were later joined in the group by Heaps, who was an acquaintance of Goulbourn. The group cite interests from The Beatles, Otis Redding, Kelly Jones, Green Day, John Bonham, and Cher.

The band began producing music on SoundCloud in July 2016, with their first track titled "Cheap Thrills". This was followed a few months later by their debut EP release "Ecstasy", "How Do You Sleep", and "Intoxicate Me". The group began touring at venues including Clwb Ifor Bach for Cardiff University's Xpresstival, Warehouse 54 in Newport, and Fiddler's Elbow in Camden. The band have been managed since August 2018 by Stephanie Brennan; formerly of WME and Kobalt Records; and James Brennan, both of whom are based with the Dark Horses agency. Their upcoming release The Masquerade is set to be released independently.

The band's music is largely written by Griffiths and Williams and the band have worked closely with former Estrons member Steffan Pringle, who also works with rising Welsh names Adwaith and Jack Perrett.

The band drew large scale attention with the release of their track "Thank God I'm Not You". BBC Cymru Wales presenter Adam Walton reportedly called the band for permission to play the track on air within a day of its release, and the band went on to appear on BBC Radio 1 with Edith Bowman, Virgin Radio, Amazing Radio, and Radio X, with the track named by the latter as the This Feeling Track Of The Week for the week commencing January 8, 2018.

The band toured extensively in 2018 with appearances at BBC Music Introducing Stage at Reading and Leeds Festival, Isle of Wight Festival, the BBC Music Introducing/PRS for Music stage at South by Southwest 2018, Cardiff Sŵn Festival, the Horizons Gorwelion stage at Festival N°6, a two venue run with Kaiser Chiefs, and sets at Truck Festival, Y Not Festival, Tramlines Festival, HOYfest, and a headline set at Nambuccapalooza in London.

To date, the band's headline track "Thank God I'm Not You" has over 27 million streams on Spotify and the related music video is their most viewed upload on YouTube.

In 2019 Himalayas played All Points East, Mad Cool Festival in Madrid and The Festival Republic Tent at Reading & Leeds Festival.

The band announced their 2019 single, "The Masquerade", during their BBC Radio 2 debut on the Johnnie Walker show, which will be their first independent release after leaving their previous label.

In 2020 Himalayas signed to Wild Music Management who have worked with Manic Street Preachers, AC/DC, Pink, Courteeners.

In Summer 2021 Himalayas had their a debut TV performance at The Hundreds on BBC sports. September 2021 saw Himalayas embarking on a headline tour which started with a sold out show at The Globe in their hometown of Cardiff and ended with another sold out show at The Garage in London. Himalayas supported Manic Street Preachers for two shows in September and December 2021.

In May 2022 Himalayas announced via their social media page that they had signed a worldwide record deal to Nettwerk Records.

Band members

Current 

 Joe Williams - lead singer and rhythm guitar (2015–present)
 Mike Griffiths - lead guitar and vocals (2015–present)
 Louis Heaps - bass (2015–present)
 James Goulbourn - drums (2015–present)

Discography

Singles

References

External links 
 

Welsh rock music groups
Welsh indie rock groups
Welsh alternative rock groups
British garage rock groups
Musical groups established in 2015
2015 establishments in Wales